Agra is a town and comune located in the province of Varese, in the Lombardy region of northern Italy.

References

External links
Comunità Montana Valli del Luinese

Cities and towns in Lombardy